Constituency WR-18 is a reserved seat for women in the Khyber Pakhtunkhwa Assembly.

See also
 Constituency PK-49 (Haripur-I)
 Constituency PK-50 (Haripur-II)
 Constituency PK-51 (Haripur-III)
 Constituency PK-52 (Haripur-IV)
 Constituency WR-14

References

Khyber Pakhtunkhwa Assembly constituencies